John 1:23 is the twenty-third verse in the first chapter of the Gospel of John in the New Testament of the Christian Bible.

Content
In the original Greek according to Westcott-Hort this verse is:
Ἔφη, Ἐγὼ φωνὴ βοῶντος ἐν τῇ ἐρήμῳ, Εὐθύνατε τὴν ὁδὸν Κυρίου, καθὼς εἶπεν Ἠσαΐας ὁ προφήτης.  

In the King James Version of the Bible the text reads:
He said, I am the voice of one crying in the wilderness, Make straight the way of the Lord, as said the prophet Esaias.

The New International Version translates the passage as:
John replied in the words of Isaiah the prophet, "I am the voice of one calling in the desert, 'Make straight the way for the Lord.'"

Analysis
"I am the Voice, etc." comes from Isaiah 40:3. Witham expands the meaning as: "I am a servant, and prepare paths, your hearts, for the Lord. I come, he says, to say that He is at the doors who is expected, that you may be prepared to go whithersoever He may bid you.” MacEvilly notes that, "Having already declared what he was not, he now declares in very distinct terms, what he was, thus meaning to show the nothingness of his origin, compared with the Messiah."

Commentary from the Church Fathers
Augustine: "So spoke Esaias: the prophecy was fulfilled in John the Baptist."

Gregory the Great: "Ye know that the only-begotten Son is called the Word of the Father. Now we know, in the case of our own utterance, the voice first sounds, and then the word is heard. Thus John declares himself to be the voice, i. e. because he precedes the Word, and, through his ministry, the Word of the Father is heard by man."

Origen: "Heracleon, in his discussion on John and the Prophets, infers that because the Saviour was the Word, and John the voice, therefore the whole of the prophetic order was only sound. To which we reply, that, if the trumpet gives an uncertain sound, who shall prepare himself for the battle? If the voice of prophecy is nothing but sound, why does the Saviour send us to it, saying, Search the Scriptures? (John 5:39) But John calls himself the voice, not that crieth, but of one that crieth in the wilderness; viz. of Him Who stood and cried, If any man thirst, let him come unto Me and drink. (John 7:37) He cries, in order that those at a distance may hear him, and understand from the loudness of the sound, the vastness of the thing spoken of."

Theophylact of Ohrid: "Or because he declared the truth plainly, while all who were under the law spoke obscurely."

Gregory the Great: "John crieth in the wilderness, because it is to forsaken and destitute Judæa that he bears the consolatory tidings of a Redeemer."

Origen: "There is need of the voice crying in the wilderness, that the soul, forsaken by God, may be recalled to making straight the way of the Lord, following no more the crooked paths of the serpent. This has reference both to the contemplative life, as enlightened by truth, without mixture of falsehood, and to the practical, as following up the correct perception by the suitable action. Wherefore he adds, Make straight the way of the Lord, as saith the prophet, Esaias."

Gregory the Great: "The way of the Lord is made straight to the heart, when the word of truth is heard with humility; the way of the Lord is made straight to the heart, when the life is formed upon the precept."

References

External links
Other translations, commentary and tools related to John 1:23 are at BibleHub

01:23